The Gold Rush Country (a.k.a. Town of Gold Rush or simply Gold Rush) is a themed land at the Dreamworld theme park on the Gold Coast, Queensland, Australia.

History
The Gold Rush Country opened on 11 December 1986. The area featured the Eureka Mountain Mine Ride and the Thunder River Rapids Ride. In 2006, the Eureka Mountain Mine Ride was decommissioned due to safety concerns. In the middle of 2011, Gold Rush Country was refurbished with shops being relocated around the area in preparation for its conversion into the Town of Gold Rush. On 17 September 2011, Gold Rush Country officially reopened as the Town of Gold Rush to match BuzzSaws backstory. The Thunder River Rapids Ride was closed in October 2016 after 4 riders were killed on the ride. This saw the removal of almost every Gold Rush themed buildings, sideshow attractions and theming. BuzzSaw was permanently closed in August 2021. Steel Taipan opened in the area of the park on 15 December 2021 to positive reviews.

Attractions

Current Attractions

Dreamworld Express

The Dreamworld Express is one of Dreamworld's original, opening day attractions. At opening the ride was known as the Cannon Ball Express and only featured one stop. The train takes guests on a scenic route around Dreamworld with four stops along the way: Central Station, Billabong Station, Corroboree Station and Rocky Hollow Station.

The Giant Drop

The Giant Drop opened in 1998 as the world's tallest and fastest free fall ride. It is one of Dreamworld's Big 7 Thrill Rides and is situated on the Dreamworld Tower. The ride was manufactured by Intamin, the company responsible for the Tower of Terror which shares the same tower.

Steel Taipan

The roller coaster features a triple-launch system, a first in the Southern Hemisphere.

Previous attractions

BuzzSaw

BuzzSaw was a Maurer Söhne SkyLoop roller coaster in the Town of Gold Rush. Riders, restrained by only a lap bar, are then pulled slowly back over on themselves before the train is released into a full heartline roll. A steep drop returns riders back to the station. It closed in 2021.

Eureka Mountain Mine Ride

The Eureka Mountain Mine Ride was a wild mouse roller coaster designed by HyFab. The ride has not operated since 2006 due to safety concerns.

Helicopter Joy Flights
Helicopter Joy Flights allowed park visitors to take helicopter flights taking in views of Dreamworld and the Gold Coast. Visitors could choose from five different flight paths. Joy flights incurred an additional expense. The helicopter tours have not resumed since June 2009 when a helicopter crashed in the carpark of Dreamworld causing only minor injuries. The launch pad previously formed part of the defunct BuzzSaw's area and the sales booth was a beverage outlet named Jack's Watering Hole up until late 2016.

Rocky Hollow Log Ride

The Rocky Hollow Log Ride was a log flume which took groups of 4 riders on a gentle four and a half-minute cruise through channels, in and out of buildings, before ascending the lift hill. The ride concluded with a  drop causing all riders to become soaked.

The ride was designed and built in-house by Dreamworld with assistance from overseas engineers.

Thunder River Rapids Ride
 
 
Riders could end up quite wet due to waves splashing over the side of the raft. The ride opened in October 1986 in conjunction with the opening of Gold Rush Country. The ride originally featured a rotating platform which allowed riders to board and dismount the 6 person boats without the need for stopping them. This functionality was decommissioned due to safety concerns. The ride continued to be the park's most popular ride until its closure in 2016 after four riders were killed. On 9 November Deborah Thomas the chief executive of  Ardent Leisure, Dreamworlds' parent company, announced that the ride would be permanently closed and demolished.

Shopping & Dining
Gold Rush Country is currently home to the "Old Time Photos" store where you can purchase gold rush themed photographs. It was also formerly home to several of shopping and food and beverage outlets. Most outlets were closed in October 2016 after most of the area was closed and demolished as a result of the Thunder River Rapids incident. Prior to October 2016, Gold Rush Country featured:
 Jack's Watering Hole - a food and beverage outlet (closed 2016)
Various forms of Gold Rush themed merchandise could be purchased from the:
 BuzzSaw Mill General Store - merchandise themed to the BuzzSaw roller coaster (closed 2021)
 Thunder River Rapids Photos' - merchandise themed to the Thunder River Rapids Ride (closed 2016)
Additionally the Rocky Hollow sub-area featured a photo store (previously a cafe) for the Rocky Hollow Log Ride. The store was demolished in 2021 after remaining inactive for years.

References

1986 establishments in Australia
Themed areas in Dreamworld (Australia)
Dreamworld (Australia)
Amusement park attractions introduced in 1986
Western (genre) amusement park attractions